Breznik Heights (Breznishki Vazvisheniya \'brez-nish-ki v&-zvi-'she-ni-ya\) rises to over 600 m in the southeast part of Greenwich Island in Antarctica.  They extend 12 km between Santa Cruz Point in the northeast and the base of the moraine spit of Provadiya Hook at the mouth of Yankee Harbour in the southwest.  The heights are ice-covered except for limited precipitous areas such as those at Oborishte Ridge, Ephraim Bluff, Viskyar Ridge and Bogdan Ridge.

The heights are named after the town of Breznik in Western Bulgaria.

Location

See also
Poisson Hill

Maps
 L.L. Ivanov et al. Antarctica: Livingston Island and Greenwich Island, South Shetland Islands. Scale 1:100000 topographic map. Sofia: Antarctic Place-names Commission of Bulgaria, 2005.
 L.L. Ivanov. Antarctica: Livingston Island and Greenwich, Robert, Snow and Smith Islands. Scale 1:120000 topographic map.  Troyan: Manfred Wörner Foundation, 2009.

References
 Breznik Heights. SCAR Composite Gazetteer of Antarctica
 Bulgarian Antarctic Gazetteer. Antarctic Place-names Commission. (details in Bulgarian, basic data in English)

External links
Breznik Heights. Copernix satellite image

Mountains of the South Shetland Islands
Bulgaria and the Antarctic